The Palace is a 2011 Cypriot–Australian short film co-production, written and directed by Anthony Maras, that had its international premiere at the 2011 Telluride Film Festival and won Best Short Fiction Film and Best Screenplay in a Short Film in the 2012 Australian Academy of Cinema and Television Arts Awards.

The Palace also won top honors at a number of other film festivals and awards ceremonies including the 2012 Beverly Hills Film Festival, 2011 Sydney Film Festival (Best Short Fiction Film), 2011 Melbourne International Film Festival (Best Australian Short Film), 2012 Flickerfest International Festival of Short Films (Best Australian Short Film) and the 2011 Adelaide Film Festival (Best Short Film – Audience Award). Filmmaker Anthony Maras won the 2011 AFTRS IF Award for Rising Talent on the strength of this film and others.

The Palace was produced by AntHouse Films, Cyan Films and SeaHorse Films, as an Australia–Cyprus co-production.

Reception
The Palace has received strong critical and audience acclaim.

At the 2011 Melbourne International Film Festival Morgan Spurlock, the Academy Award Nominated Director of Super Size Me, declared The Palace "One of the best short films I’ve ever seen...”.

Box Office magazine's Pete Hammond commented "The Palace is riveting, suspenseful first class filmmaking. In just its short running time it manages to be every bit as accomplished, compelling and provocative as any full-length feature.  The Palace marks the emergence of a major filmmaker in Anthony Maras."

Peter Krausz, Chair of the Australian Film Critics Association, concluded his review after also seeing the film at the Melbourne International Film Festival ”This is pure film-making to the highest degree...”

Cine Outsider's Timothy E. Raw wrote "Director Maras' choke-hold on the audience only tightens, suspense building not to a point of release, but asphyxiating hysteria ... sixteen minutes of non-stop action that rivals the highest Hollywood standards and on more than one occasion surpasses them with blitzkrieg duck n' cover staging".

Filmoria's Richard Lennox wrote "What’s so special about The Palace is its ability to show both sides of the horror of war and at an essence the spirit of humanity against the atrocities of war ... an outstanding film which echoes a quality set by war films such as The Hurt Locker in style. Thought provoking, tense and thoroughly recommended".

Blake Howard from The Co-Op Post ended his review with "The Palace is one of the most emotionally affective and powerful short films that I’ve ever seen."

The Australian Film Review praised the film as "one of the most impressive and ambitious Australian shorts I’ve seen at the Sydney Film Festival so far. Or ever."

Cast
 Erol Afşin as Private Ömer Argun
 Kevork Malikyan as Sergeant Kerem Akalın
 Tamer Arslan as Private Mehmet Evgin
 Daphne Alexander as Stella
 Christopher Greco as Taki
 Monica Vassiliou as Eleftheria
 Vrahimis Petri as Haydar	
 Kyriakos Theodossiou as Andreas
 Maria Marouchou as Anna

Production

The "Palace" scenes were filmed at the House of Hadjigeorkakis Kornessios (1779), a landmark Ottoman Era residence which was home to the "Dragoman of Cyprus" – the chief tax collector in Cyprus during Ottoman rule – who was later hung in the town square during a revolt. The house has been restored to its former glory and now serves as a museum administered by the Department of Antiquities in the southern Greek part of Nicosia.

Awards and nominations

Awards 

2012 Australian Academy of Cinema and Television Arts Awards: Best Short Fiction Film
2012 Australian Academy of Cinema and Television Arts Awards: Best Screenplay in a Short Film
2012 Beverly Hills Film Festival: Best Short Film
2012 Beverly Hills Film Festival: Best Director
2012 Flickerfest International Short Film Festival: Best Australian Short Film
2012 Shorts Film Festival: Golden Shorts - Best Short Film
2012 Australian Film Festival: Best Short Film
2011 IF Awards: Rising Talent Award
2011 Sydney Film Festival: Best Short Film (Live Action)
2011 Melbourne International Film Festival: Best Australian Short Film
 2011 Adelaide Film Festival: Best Short Film - Audience Award
2012 Vollywood Film Festival: Best Short Film
2012 SA Screen Awards: Best Film
2012 SA Screen Awards: Best Drama
2012 SA Screen Awards: Best Direction
2012 SA Screen Awards: Best Screenplay
2012 SA Screen Awards: Best Cinematography
2012 SA Screen Awards: Best Editing
2012 Australian Cinematography Society Awards: Golden Tripod

Nominations 

2011 Australian Writers' Guild Awards: Best Short Film Screenplay
2011 Australian Screen Editors Awards: Best Editing in a Short Film

Official Selection – Film Festivals 

 Santa Barbara International Film Festival 2012
 Telluride Film Festival 2011
 IF Awards 2011
 Sydney Film Festival 2011
 Melbourne International Film Festival 2011
 Adelaide Film Festival 2011

References

External links
Official Facebook Page
 
The Co-Op Post Review
IF Awards Page
Sydney Film Festival - The Palace

2011 films
Australian drama short films
Turkish invasion of Cyprus
Films directed by Anthony Maras
Cypriot drama films
Cypriot short films